The Abu Dhabi Series, also known as the Warid Cricket Series, was a cricket tournament, contested between Pakistan and Sri Lanka, from 18 to 22 May 2007. It was hosted on neutral soil, all 3 ODIs being played at the Sheikh Zayed Cricket Stadium in Abu Dhabi, UAE. It will be the first matches played by either side since the conclusion of the 2007 Cricket World Cup. Pakistan went on to win the series 2-1, only losing the final match of the series. All 3 matches were Day/Night matches.

Squad lists

Squad changes

Pakistan
Following the retirement of Inzamam-ul-Haq after Pakistan's shock World Cup Group Stage exit, Pakistan named Shoaib Malik as ul-Haq's successor as captain. Younis Khan and Shoaib Akhtar were both dropped - Akhtar for his fitness, whilst Khan is playing English county cricket with Yorkshire County Cricket Club. Salman Butt was recalled to the team after 9 months out of the side.

Sri Lanka
Only nine of the fifteen players in the Sri Lankan squad who were present for their 2007 World Cup campaign are in the squad for the Abu Dhabi Series - Russel Arnold retired following the World Cup, whilst Muttiah Muralitharan, Kumar Sangakkara and Chaminda Vaas were all rested in order to be given the opportunity to play for their respective English county cricket teams. Young bowler Nuwan Kulasekara was dropped from the side, as well as former captain Marvan Atapattu, with Sri Lanka Cricket explaining they wanted to give experience to younger players, such as Malinda Warnapura who had earlier impressed for Sri Lanka A.

Coaches
Both teams had experienced recent changes in coaches: Pakistan's coach Bob Woolmer died in the West Indies following the team's exit from the World Cup - the investigation into his death, amidst claims of murder, is still ongoing. No full-time coach had been named before the series, although there has been speculation as to current Bangladesh coach Dav Whatmore taking over once he steps down at the end of India's tour of Bangladesh. Sri Lanka's coach Tom Moody announced his intention to leave Sri Lanka and return to Australia to coach the Western Warriors following the series.

ODI series

1st ODI

2nd ODI

3rd ODI

References

External links
 CricketArchive Tour Homepage 
 Cricinfo Tour Homepage

Cricket in the United Arab Emirates
Abu Dhabi Series, 2007
International cricket competitions in 2007